The 7th Kalasha TV & Film Awards ceremony, presented by the Kenya Film Commission (KFC), honored the best Kenyan films of 2017 and took place at the Crowne Plaza Hotel, in Upper Hill, Nairobi, Kenya. The ceremony was held on December 11, 2017. During the ceremony, the Kenya Film Commission presented Kalasha Awards in 16 categories which included Best Feature Film, Best Original Score, Best Short Film, Best Director of Photography, Best Editor, Best Documentary and Best Local Language Film.

Awards
Winners are listed first, highlighted in boldface, and indicated with a double dagger.

References

External links

Official websites

 
 

2018 film awards
Kenyan film awards